The James Joyce Tower and Museum is a Martello tower in Sandycove, Dublin, where James Joyce spent six nights in 1904. The opening scenes of his 1922 novel Ulysses take place here,
and the tower is a place of pilgrimage for Joyce enthusiasts, especially on Bloomsday. Admission is free.

History
The tower was leased from the War Office by Joyce's university friend Oliver St. John Gogarty, with the purpose of "Hellenising" Ireland. Joyce stayed there for six days, from 9 to 14 September in 1904. Gogarty later attributed Joyce's abrupt departure to a midnight incident with a loaded revolver.

The opening scenes of Ulysses are set the morning after this incident.  Gogarty is immortalised as "Stately, plump Buck Mulligan" (the opening words of the novel).

The tower now contains a museum dedicated to Joyce and displays some of his possessions and other ephemera associated with Ulysses (e.g., "Plumtree's Potted Meat" pot). The living space is set up to resemble its 1904 appearance, and contains a ceramic panther to represent one seen in a dream by a resident. It is a place of pilgrimage for Joyce enthusiasts, especially on Bloomsday.

It was purchased in 1954 by architect Michael Scott who, in 1937, built his house, Geragh, next door, on a former quarry. In 1962, he donated the tower for the purpose of making it a museum. Michael Scott is  co-founder, with financial assistance by John Huston, of the James Joyce Museum at the Joyce Tower.

The Tower became a museum opening on  16 June 1962 through the efforts of Dublin artist John Ryan. Ryan also rescued the front door to 7 Eccles Street (now at the James Joyce Centre) from demolition and organised, with Brian O'Nolan, the first Bloomsday Celebration in 1954.

The James Joyce Tower is open Thursday-Sunday , 10am-4pm  Admission is free, though visits can be booked in advance on the website for a small donation. The museum is run by the Friends of Joyce Tower Society on a voluntary basis.

See also
 Forty Foot, an ocean swimming place, one hundred yards from the tower

References

External links
Official website

Towers completed in 1804
Buildings and structures in Dún Laoghaire–Rathdown
Museums in Dún Laoghaire–Rathdown
Biographical museums in the Republic of Ireland
James Joyce
Towers in the Republic of Ireland
Literary museums in Ireland
Martello towers